The Adjutant General's Individual Award is the eighth highest military decoration that can be conferred to a service member of the Texas Military Forces. Subsequent decorations are conferred by a white enameled five-pointed star trimmed in gold device.

Eligibility
The Adjutant General's Individual Award is conferred to any service member of the Texas Military Forces who, while serving in any capacity with the Texas Military Forces, shall have distinguished themselves by meritorious achievement or outstanding service, when such action or duty is extremely noteworthy but of a lesser degree than required for award of a higher decoration.

Authority 
The Adjutant General's Individual Award was approved by the Adjutant General Major General Thomas S. Bishop on 1 November 1968.

Description

Ribbon 
The award is a green moiré silk ribbon, 1-3/8 of an inch wide and 3/8 of an inch high, behind a large white enameled five-pointed star, trimmed in gold, 3/8 of an inch in circumscribing diameter and mounted in the center of the ribbon, one point up. The green color is the same as the green color used in the ribbon of the United States Armed Forces Mexican Border Service Medal.

Device 
A white enameled five-pointed star, trimmed in gold, 3/8th of an inch in circumscribing diameter, is conferred for second and successive awards. "Stars will be worn centered on the ribbon, with one point up, in conjunction with the star that is part of the original decoration. A maximum of four stars, to include the star that is part of the original decoration, will be worn".

See also 

 Awards and decorations of the Texas Military
 Awards and decorations of the Texas government
 Texas Military Forces
 Texas Military Department
 List of conflicts involving the Texas Military

External links
Adjutant General's Individual Award

References

Texas
Texas Military Forces
Texas Military Department